Apostolepis sanctaeritae is a species of snake in the family Colubridae. It is endemic to Brazil.

References 

sanctaeritae
Reptiles described in 1924
Reptiles of Brazil
Taxa named by Franz Werner